The Gannes station (Gare de Gannes) is a railway station on the Paris-Nord - Lille line located in the commune of Gannes in the Oise department, France. The station is served by TER Hauts-de-France trains.

The station was first opened in 1846 by the Compagnie des chemins de fer du Nord (Nord Railway Company). The station formerly had a marshalling yard, used by the surrounding small rural industry. The station was closed in 1940, and was reopened at the Liberation of France. The station building was abandoned and torn down in the 1970s.

See also
List of SNCF stations in Hauts-de-France

References

Railway stations in Oise
Railway stations in France opened in 1846